Cieszyn is a border town in southern Poland on the east bank of the Olza River, and the administrative seat of Cieszyn County, Silesian Voivodeship. The town has 33,500 inhabitants ( and lies opposite Český Těšín in the Czech Republic. Both towns belong to the historical region of Cieszyn Silesia, and formerly as one town composed the capital of the Duchy of Cieszyn.

Geography

The town is situated on the Olza river, a tributary of the Oder River, which forms the border with the Czech Republic. It is located within the western Silesian Foothills north of the Silesian Beskids and Mt. Czantoria Wielka, a popular ski resort. Cieszyn is the heart of the historical region of Cieszyn Silesia, the southeasternmost part of Upper Silesia. Until the end of World War I in 1918 it was a seat of the Dukes of Teschen.

In 1920 Cieszyn Silesia was divided between the two newly created states of Poland and Czechoslovakia, with the smaller western suburbs of Teschen becoming part of Czechoslovakia as a new town called Český Těšín. The larger part of the town joined Poland as Cieszyn. Three bridges connect the twin towns. After Poland and the Czech Republic joined the European Union and its passport-free Schengen zone, border controls were abolished and residents of both the Polish and Czech part could move freely across the border. The combined population of Polish and Czech parts of the city is 61,201 inhabitants. Cieszyn is the southern terminus of the Polish National road 1 leading to Gdańsk on the Baltic coast.

The town combines both Polish and Old–Austrian peculiarities in the style of its buildings. Because of several major fires and subsequent reconstructions (the last one in the late 18th century), the picturesque old town is sometimes called Little Vienna. The only relic of the ancient castle is a square tower, dating from the 14th century and 11th century romanesque chapel.

History

The area has been populated by West Slavic peoples since at least the 7th century. According to legend, in 810 three sons of a prince – Bolko, Leszko and Cieszko, met here after a long pilgrimage, found a spring, and decided to found a new settlement. They called it Cieszyn, from the words cieszym się ("I'm happy"). This well can be found at ulica Trzech Braci ("Three Brothers Street"), just west of the town square.

The town was the capital of the Duchy of Teschen since 1290, which was ruled by Piast dynasty until 1653 and by the Habsburg Dynasty of Austria until 1918. It was in Teschen that Maria Theresa and Frederick II on in May 1779 signed the Teschen Peace Treaty, which put an end to the War of the Bavarian Succession. In the 19th century Teschen was known for its ethnic, religious and cultural diversity, containing mostly German, Polish, Jewish and Czech communities. There was also a small Hungarian community in the town consisting mostly of officers and clerks.

The town was divided in July 1920, by the Spa Conference, a body formed by the Versailles Treaty, leaving a Polish minority on the Czechoslovak side. Its smaller western suburbs became what is now the town of Český Těšín in the Czech Republic. During the interwar period two villages were merged into Cieszyn: Błogocice in 1923 and Bobrek in 1932. After 1920 many ethnic Germans left the town, while many Poles from the Czechoslovakian part of the region moved in. According to the Polish census of 1921, Cieszyn had 15,268 inhabitants, of whom 9,241 (60.5%) were Poles, 4,777 (31.2%) were Germans, 1014 (6.6%) were Jews, and 195 (1.3%) were Czechs. The census from 1931 indicated 14,707 inhabitants, of whom 12,145 (82.7%) were Poles, while the rest consisted mostly of Germans and Jews (in 1937 estimated to be 12 and 8% respectively).

Cieszyn and Český Těšín were merged again in October 1938 when Poland annexed the Zaolzie area together with Český Těšín. In 1939 Cieszyn Silesia was occupied by German forces and during World War II it was part of Nazi Germany. Almost the entire Jewish community was murdered by the Nazis.

After World War II, the border between Poland and Czechoslovakia was restored to that of 1920. Most Germans fled or were expelled and were replaced with Poles expelled from the Polish areas annexed by the Soviet Union. Signs of the former German presence in the town were removed by a special committee.

On 19 July 1970, five firefighters from Cieszyn died when a bridge they were on fell into the Olza River, due to heavy flooding. In 1977, Boguszowice, Gułdowy, Kalembice, Krasna, Mnisztwo, Pastwiska were amalgamated with Cieszyn and Marklowice.

Culture

Since the 18th century Cieszyn Silesia has been an important centre of Polish Protestantism when the Jesus Church was built as the only one in Upper Silesia. Currently, Cieszyn is also the site of the Cieszyn Summer Film Festival, one of the most influential film festivals in Poland. There is also an earlier established Czech-Polish-Slovak film festival.

Industry
Cieszyn is an important centre of the electromechanical industry. It is also the site of the Olza Cieszyn sweets factory (where the famous Prince Polo wafers are made) and the Brackie Browar, where Żywiec Porter is brewed. The main source of income for many citizens is trade with the nearby Czech Republic and retail trade associated with transit across the two bridges over the Olza to Český Těšín. In the past, the city was home to many furniture factories.

Sites of interest

 Romanesque St. Nicholas' Chapel (Kaplica św. Mikołaja, a rotunda from the 11th century)
 Remnants of the Piast dynasty castle
 Piast Castle Tower (Wieża Piastowska, mostly 14th century)
 Gothic St. Mary Magdalene Church (Kościół Marii Magdaleny, 13th century)
 Old Town Square (Rynek)
 bourgeoisie houses (15th–19th centuries)
 Town Hall (Ratusz, early 19th century)
 Former minting house (18th century)
 Lutheran Church of Jesus (18th century)
 Museum of Cieszyn Silesia in the former Larisch family palace (Pałac Laryszów, Muzeum Śląska Cieszyńskiego, the first museum in Poland)
 Castle Brewery (Browar Zamkowy, 1846)
 Habsburg Palace in Cieszyn
 Bonifraters Monastery (18th century)
 The protestant Church of Jesus (Kościół Jezusowy), with a baroque tower and statues of the Four Evangelists above the altar that liven up the plain interior.

Notable people

Jiří Třanovský (1592–1637), theologian and composer
Adam Christian Agricola (1593–1645), evangelical preacher
Carl Friedrich Kotschy (1789–1856), botanist and theologian
 (1825–1906), journalist, writer
Jakub Skrobanek (born c. 1835–1910), merchant, banker and mayor of Cieszyn
Rudolf Ramek (1881–1941), Austrian politician, Chancellor of Austria
 (1887–1915), Polish writer
Hermann Heller (1891–1933), jurist
Viktor Ullmann (1898–1944), Jewish musician
Max Rostal (1905–1991), violinist and educator
Herbert Czaja (1914–1997), German politician (CDU)
Richard Pipes (1923–2018), Polish-American historian, Harvard University Professor
 (born 1943), German sculptor, professor
 (1945–2017), artist
Karol Semik (born 1953), teacher and educator
Beata Nowok (born 1978), statistician and researcher
Magdalena Gwizdoń (born 1979), biathlete
Ireneusz Jeleń (born 1981), footballer
Tomisław Tajner (born 1983), ski jumper
Jan Błachowicz (born 1983), mixed martial artist and former UFC Light Heavyweight Champion
Piotr Żyła (born 1987), ski jumper, world champion

Twin towns – sister cities

Cieszyn is twinned with:

 Balchik, Bulgaria
 Cambrai, France
 Český Těšín, Czech Republic
 Genk, Belgium
 Puck, Poland
 Rožňava, Slovakia
 Teuva, Finland

Gallery

References

Further reading

External links

 
 Museum of Cieszyn Silesia (Muzeum Śląska Cieszyńskiego)
 Jewish Community in Cieszyn on Virtual Shtetl

 
Czech Republic–Poland border crossings
Silesian Voivodeship (1920–1939)
Divided cities